The 2019 Los Angeles Valiant season was the second season of Los Angeles Valiant's existence in the Overwatch League. The Valiant entered the season under head coach Moon Byung-chul as the defending Pacific Division champions and looked to improve from their 2018 season, when the team qualified for the playoffs but fell in the semifinals to the London Spitfire.

Los Angeles struggled in the first stage of the season, not winning a single match in Stage 1. With the poor start, the Valiant fired head coach Moon and Mike "Packing10" Szklanny took over as the interim head coach for the remainder of the season. The team's first victory came on April 12 in a 3–2 win over the Atlanta Reign. The Valiant finished Stage 2 with an improved, but disappointing, 3–4 record. After the All-Star break, the Valiant hit their stride. Highlighted by a 3–1 win over the undefeated Vancouver Titans, the Valiant amassed a 5–2 record in Stage 3 to claim the sixth seed in the Stage 3 Playoffs. After taking down the Hangzhou Spark 3–2 in the quarterfinals, the Valiant fell to the San Francisco Shock, 0–4 in the semifinals. Despite the team's resurgence, a 0–4 to the Shock in the final match of the regular season prevented the Valiant from qualifying for the season playoffs.

Preceding offseason

Player re-signings 
From August 1 to September 9, 2018, all Overwatch League teams that competed in the 2018 season could choose to extend their team's players' contracts. Valiant released three of their twelve players – tank Finnbjörn "Finnsi" Jónasson, tank Seb "Numlocked" Barton, and support Stefano "Verbo" Disalvo.

Free agency 
All non-expansion teams could not enter the free agency period until October 8, 2018; they were able to sign members from their respective academy team and make trades until then. On September 13, Valiant acquired main tank Kim "KuKi" Dae-kuk from Seoul Dynasty. On October 18, Valiant transferred DPS Terence "SoOn" Tarlier to an unnamed team, later revealed to be 2019 expansion team Paris Eternal. On the same day, Los Angeles traded assistant coaches Julien "Daemon" Ducros and Jordan "Gunba" Graham to Paris Eternal and Boston Uprising, respectively.

Regular season

Stage 1 
Valiant opened their 2019 season with a 2–3 loss against Hangzhou Spark. Valiant would not find a single win in Stage 1 – a dramatic difference from the teams 2018 season, where Valiant finished with the best record in the Pacific Division. Two days after their final match of Stage 1, Valiant fired head coach Byungchul "Moon" Moon and announced that Mike "Packing10" Szklanny would the acting interim head coach on March 11.

Stage 2 
Los Angeles began Stage 2 on April 5 with a 0–4 sweep by San Francisco Shock to pick up their eighth consecutive loss of the season. Five days later, Valiant hired Marvin "Promise" Schröder, who previously was an assistant coach for Florida Mayhem, as an assistant coach. The team broke their losing streak on April 12 with a 3–2 victory over Atlanta Reign, marking their first win of the 2019 season. Valiant picked up a pair of wins throughout the remainder of the stage to finish with a Stage 2 record of 3–4.

Stage 3 
Prior to the start of Stage 3, the Valiant traded main tank Koo "Fate" Pan-seung to Florida Mayhem in exchange for off-tank Caleb "McGravy" McGarvey and Mayhem Academy players Russell "FCTFCTN" Campbell and Johannes "Shax" Nielsen.

Los Angeles opened Stage 3 on June 6 with a 1–3 loss to the Shanghai Dragons. The next day, the team parted ways with DPS Chae "Bunny" Jun-hyeok. The team rebounded from their previous loss the next day, as they swept the Chengdu Hunters, 4–0. The following week, the Valiant took on the Guangzhou Charge Los Angeles took advantage of the Charge's inability to change strategies throughout the match and came out with a 3–1 victory. The team's next match was against the Dragons, who had defeated them just weeks prior, on June 20. The team built on their recent momentum and took a 3–1 win. Three days later, the Valiant took on the undefeated Vancouver Titans. Despite losing the first map, the Valiant stormed back to take the next three maps and won the match 3–1, snapping the Titans 19-game winning streak and handing them their first loss of the regular season. For their final week of the stage, the Valiant first took on the Hangzhou Spark on June 27. The match went down to the wire, as the teams went to a fifth tiebreaker map, but Los Angeles could not pull out the win and lost 2–3. The team's final match of the stage was against the London Spitfire the following day. The Valiant utilized an effective Sombra composition throughout the match and swept the Spitfire, 4–0.

Finishing Stage 3 with an impressive 5–2 record, the Valiant claimed the sixth seed in the Stage 3 Playoffs. For their quarterfinals match, the team took on the third-seeded Hangzhou Spark on 12 July. The match opened on Ilios, while Hangzhou kept it close in both rounds, the Valiant came out with a map win. The Spark quickly turned it around, however, claiming wins on Hollywood and Paris, largely due to a strong performance from main tank Xu "guxue" Qiulin on Winston on both maps. However, the Valiant evened the match score with a win on Havana, bringing the match to a fifth tiebreaker map. The match went to Oasis; the Valiant handed the Spark their first ever map five loss and won the series 3–2. Advancing to the semifinals, the Valiant faced the Stage 2 Champions San Francisco Shock the following day. After losing on the first map, Oasis, the Valiant selected Eichenwalde for map two. The Shock were able to complete the map on their attack, but the Valiant were unable to do the same. Coming out of the match break down 0–2, the Valiant could not turn things around, as they fell on the following two maps to get swept, 0–4.

Stage 4 
Prior to the beginning of Stage 4, which would include the implementation of an enforced 2-2-2 role lock by the league, main tank Kim "KuKi" Dae-kuk retired. Additionally, the Valiant transferred support Kim "Izayaki" Min-chul, who mostly acted as a substitute for Park "KariV" Young-seo throughout the season, to the Shanghai Dragons.

The Valiant's first match of Stage 4 was against the Paris Eternal on July 27. After winning the first two maps, the Valiant fell on maps three and four, pushing the match to a fifth tiebreaker map. The two-hour match concluded with Los Angeles winning on the final map, Busan, to win the series, 3–2. The team's next match was against the Seoul Dynasty on August 1. Like their previous match, the series went to a fifth tiebreaker map; however, the Valiant did not come out the a win on the final map and lost by a score of 2–3. The team rebounded two days later, as they defeated the Dallas Fuel by a 3–1 scoreline. The following week, Los Angeles first took on the Florida Mayhem. Despite Florida's DPS Ha "Sayaplayer" Jeong-woo breaking the record for most final blows in a map at 42, the Valiant were able to come out with a 2–1 win. The team's next match was on August 17, against the Boston Uprising. After winning the first two maps, the Valiant dropped map three. Map four, Havana, went to overtime rounds after both teams completed the map on their first attack, but the Valiant was able to come out with the map win and won the series, 3–1.

For the final week of the season, the Valiant hosted the "Kit Kat Rivalry Weekend" at The Novo in Los Angeles. The Valiant needed a win in at least one of their final two matches in order to qualify for the season playoffs. For their first match of the weekend, Los Angeles faced the Los Angeles Gladiators in the "Battle for LA." The Valiant could not come out with the win, as they fell 1–3 to their in-town rivals. For their last match of the season, the team took on the San Francisco Shock for the "California Cup" on August 25. However, the Valiant could not take down the Shock, as they were swept 0–4 to end their season.

Final roster

Transactions 
Transactions of/for players on the roster during the 2019 regular season:
On May 10, Valiant traded Koo "Fate" Pan-seung to Florida Mayhem in exchange for Caleb "Mcgravy" McGarvy, Russell "FCTFCTN" Campbell, and Johannes "Shax" Nielsen.
On June 7, Valiant released Chae "Bunny" Joon-hyuk.
On July 6, Kim "KuKi" Dae-kuk retired.
On July 20, Valiant transferred Kim "Izayaki" Min-chul to Shanghai Dragons.

Standings

Record by stage

League

Game log

Regular season

Playoffs

References 

2019 Overwatch League seasons by team
Los Angeles Valiant
Los Angeles Valiant seasons